Broadheath (Altrincham) railway station served Broadheath and the northern part of Altrincham in Cheshire, England, between its opening in 1853 and closure in 1962.

Station construction, opening and ownership

The station was built by the Warrington and Altrincham Junction Railway, which changed its name to the Warrington and Stockport Railway (W&SR)  shortly before the station was opened on 1 November 1853.  Initially the name used was Altrincham W & S, but this was changed to Broadheath (Altrincham) in November 1856. The W&SR was incorporated in the London and North Western Railway (LNWR) on 15 July 1867. The LNWR was merged into the London Midland and Scottish Railway on 1 January 1923.

Location and facilities
The station was situated on an embankment immediately to the west of the A56 Manchester Road, which the line crossed on an overbridge at the junction with Viaduct Road, and 100 yards (90 m) north of the A56 bridge over the Bridgewater Canal. The line had two sets of railway tracks, with platforms at each.  The northern platform served trains to Manchester and the southern platform served trains to Lymm and Warrington Arpley.

Completion of railway lines serving Broadheath station
The line from Warrington Arpley was opened to Broadheath on 1 November 1853. An extension from Broadheath to meet the Manchester South Junction and Altrincham Railway (MSJAR) was opened on 1 May 1854. Parliamentary approval was obtained by the W&S for an extension to Stockport, but financial problems meant that this was never completed. The Cheshire Lines Committee completed their line from Stockport Tiviot Dale to Skelton Junction on 1 December 1865 and a CLC extension to meet the LNWR line at Broadheath Junction was completed on 1 February 1866.

Train services from Broadheath station
From 1854 onwards, the LNWR operated local passenger trains from Liverpool Lime Street and Warrington Arpley, through Broadheath to Manchester. The 1922 railway timetable showed fifteen trains each weekday from Broadheath to Manchester London Road, where the trains terminated in the MSJAR platforms, having run along MSJAR rails from Broadheath Junction. The journey took between 25 and 33 minutes, depending on the number of intermediate stations served by the specific train. Trains to Liverpool Lime Street took ninety minutes with up to fifteen intermediate stops. Passenger services ceased on 10 September 1962.

References
Notes

Bibliography

Disused railway stations in Trafford
Former London and North Western Railway stations
Railway stations in Great Britain opened in 1853
Railway stations in Great Britain closed in 1962
Altrincham